Homecoming! is an album by  jazz pianist Elmo Hope recorded in 1961 for the Riverside label.

Reception

The AllMusic review by Brandon Burke stated "Homecoming! is a particularly high-spirited record for this stage in Hope's troubled career. Following an extended stay in Los Angeles, a number of the day's top players helped welcome a refreshed Hope back to New York on this session... Expect fine performances by all. This great hard bop record is highly recommended".

Track listing
All compositions by Elmo Hope except as indicated
 "Moe, Jr." – 5:56   
 "Moe, Jr." [alternate take] – 4:41 Bonus track on CD reissue   
 "La Berthe" – 3:14   
 "Eyes So Beautiful as Yours" – 6:33   
 "Homecoming" – 5:15   
 "One Mo' Blues" – 6:48   
 "A Kiss for My Love" – 5:33   
 "A Kiss for My Love" [alternate take] – 5:39 Bonus track on CD reissue  
 "Imagination" (Johnny Burke, Jimmy Van Heusen) – 6:43

Personnel 
Elmo Hope – piano 
Blue Mitchell – trumpet (tracks 1, 2, 4, 7 & 8) 
Frank Foster, Jimmy Heath – tenor saxophone (tracks 1, 2, 4, 7 & 8)
Percy Heath – bass
Philly Joe Jones – drums

References 

1961 albums
Riverside Records albums
Elmo Hope albums